Christel E. Marquardt (born Chicago, Illinois) is a judge on the Kansas Court of Appeals, having served since 1995.

Marquardt received a B.S. in education from Missouri Western State College.  After teaching school in Wisconsin, she attended Washburn University School of Law; she received her Juris Doctor in 1974. Marquardt joined the Topeka law firm Cosgrove, Webb & Oman in 1974. In 1986, she moved to Palmer, Marquardt & Snyder. In 1991, she joined the Kansas City firm Levy & Craig, P.C. Three years later, she formed Marquardt & Associates, L.L.C. with her son. She practiced at this firm until her appointment to the court.

Marquardt has three adult sons and six grandchildren.

References

External links
 Kansas Court of Appeals website
 Judge Marquardt's official judicial performance report

Living people
Missouri Western State University alumni
Washburn University School of Law alumni
American women judges
Kansas Court of Appeals Judges
Year of birth missing (living people)
21st-century American women